"Xicochi" is a 17th-century motet, written by Gaspar Fernandes while he was organist of Puebla Cathedral. It serves as an example of the influence of indigenous Nahua culture, dominant in Mesoamerica at the time, on colonial Spanish music.

In 2000, Linda Ronstadt recorded the song for A Merry Little Christmas.

Lyrics

Nahuatl original
Xicochi, xicochi,Xicochi, xicochiXicochi conetzintleXicochi conetzintleCa omizhuihuixoco in angelosmeCa omizhuihuixoco in angelosmeCa omizhuihuixoco in angelosmeIn angelosme in angelosmeAlleluya alleluya

English translation
Sleep, sleepSleep, sleepSleep, precious babySleep, precious babyIndeed, the angels have come here to rock you to sleepIndeed, the angels have come here to rock you to sleepIndeed, the angels have come here to rock you to sleep

Alleluia, alleluia

Sources 
Watkins, Timothy D. "Finding Nahua Influence in Spanish Colonial Music." Rhodes College. Hassell Hall. 24 September 2008.

Mexican music
17th-century songs
Motets